Qaleh-ye Shahpur Khani (also Romanized as Qal‘eh-ye Shāhpūr Khānī; also known as Qal‘eh-ye ‘Alī Jahāngīrī and Qal‘eh-ye Shāhpūr) is a village in Hamaijan Rural District, Hamaijan District, Sepidan County, Fars Province, Iran. At the 2006 census, its population was 19, in 5 families.

References 

Populated places in Sepidan County